Val-d'Izé is a commune in the department of Ille-et-Vilaine in the Brittany Region of northwestern France.

Population
Inhabitants of Val-d'Izé are called Izéens in French.

See also
Communes of the Ille-et-Vilaine department

References

External links

Mayors of Ille-et-Vilaine Association 

Communes of Ille-et-Vilaine